"They're Playing Our Song" is a song by dance-pop and freestyle music singer Trinere which was released as a 12-inch single from her album Trinere in 1986 in Canada, and 1987 elsewhere. It reached number 67 on the Billboard R&B chart.

Track listing
12" single

 Germany 12" single

Charts

References

1986 singles
Trinere songs
1986 songs
Song articles with missing songwriters